Motta is an Italian surname. The Portuguese and Spanish version is Mota, while the French version is Motte. Notable people with the surname include:

Afonso Motta (born 1950), Brazilian politician
Angelo Motta (1890–1957), Italian businessman and politician
Bess Motta (born 1958), American actress and singer
Carlos Carmelo Vasconcellos Motta (1890–1982), Brazilian Catholic cardinal
Cássio Motta (born 1960) Brazilian professional tennis player
Dick Motta (born 1931), American basketball coach
Ed Motta (born 1971), Brazilian musician
Fernanda Motta (born 1981), Brazilian model and actress
Francesco Motta (born 1986), Italian singer-songwriter
Gianni Motta (born 1943), Italian bicycle racer
Giuseppe Motta (1871–1940), Swiss politician
Giuseppe Motta (aviator) (died 1929), Italian World War I fighter pilot and seaplane air racer
José Vianna da Motta (Sometimes spelt Mota, 1868–1948), Portuguese composer and pianist
Marcelo Ramos Motta (1931–1987), Brazilian writer
Marco Aurelio Motta (born 1960), Brazilian volleyball coach
Marco Motta (born 1986), Italian footballer
Mauricio Motta Gomes, Brazilian martial artist
Paulo César Motta (born 1982), Guatemalan football goalkeeper
Ramon Motta (born 1988), Brazilian footballer
Stalin Motta (born 1984), Colombian footballer
Simone Motta (born 1977), Italian footballer
Thiago Motta (born 1982), Brazilian-born Italian footballer
Zeke Motta (born 1990), American football player
Zezé Motta (born 1944), Brazilian actress and singer

Italian-language surnames